"Good Fruit" is a single by British indie rock band Hefner.  Released in 2000 by Too Pure, it was the first single from their album We Love the City.

Amelia Fletcher of other British bands such as Heavenly and Talulah Gosh contributed backing vocals on the song.

Track listing

The single was released in three formats:

CD1
 "Good Fruit"
 "Jubilee"
 "Blackhorse Road"

CD2
 "Good Fruit"
 "I Will Make Her Love Me"
 "Seafaring"

7"
 "Good Fruit" (The Wisdom of Harry Remix)
 "Good Fruit" (Piano Magic Remix)

Hefner (band) songs
2000 songs
Too Pure singles